Laura Nativo (born October 16, 1980) is an American actress. She appeared in Aquanoids as the character Vanessa DuMont.

Filmography

Actress
Celebrity (1998) as Jailbait (uncredited)
High Voltage (2002) as Catholic Schoolgirl
The Violent Kind (2002) as Wendy
Bleed (2002) as Laura
Aquanoids (2003) as Vanessa
Birth Rite (2003) as Erin
Delta Delta Die! (2003) as Infomercial Woman
Comic Book: The Movie (2004) as herself
Repo!: The Genetic Opera (2006) as Nurse
Alpha Dog (2006) as Party Girl
Threshold (2007) as Angel of Death

Producer
Surf School (2006) executive producer
Threshold (2007) producer
Rule of Three (2008) co-producer

Music supervisor
Surf School (2006)

Greatest American Dog
In 2008, Laura and her dog Preston competed on CBS' TV series Greatest American Dog for $250,000 and the title "Greate American Dog." They were eliminated in the episode, "Salvador Doggy."

External links

1980 births
American film actresses
Living people
People from Parsippany-Troy Hills, New Jersey
Actresses from New Jersey
21st-century American women